Hilal Ahmar means Red Crescent in English. Hilal Ahmar is a charitable organization; the equivalent of the International Red Cross. Hilal Ahmar is a humanitarian non-profit organization that provides emergency assistance, disaster relief, and disaster preparedness in Pakistan. 

The Hilal e Ahmar was renamed the Kızılay Derneği in Turkey in 1935. 
Red Crescent society in Pakistan is still called Anjuman e Hilal e Ahmar Pakistan. It was founded on December 20, 1947 by the founder of Pakistan, Muhammad Ali Jinnah.

See also 
 List of Red Cross and Red Crescent Societies
 International Red Cross and Red Crescent Movement
 Turkish Red Crescent
 Pakistan Red Crescent Society
 Iranian Red Crescent Society
 Algerian Red Crescent Society
 Saudi Arabian Red Crescent Society
 Syrian Arab Red Crescent

External links 
 International Red Cross and Red Crescent
 Hilal Ahmar Indonesia
 Red Crescent and Red Cross Club 

Arabic words and phrases

tr:Hilâl-i Ahmer Cemiyeti